Squarehead may refer to:

Music
 Squarehead (band), a garage pop band
 "Squarehead", a song by Iggy Pop from the 1988 album Instinct
 "Squarehead", a 2007 video by band Hello Seahorse!

Fictional characters
 SC2c "Squarehead" Larsen, in the 1945 film They Were Expendable
 Squarehead, in the 1938 film Juvenile Court
 Squareheads, in the 1950 novel The Golden Pine Cone

Other uses
 Tetragonotheca helianthoides, a species of flowering plant
 Squarehead, a pejorative term used for Germans and Scandinavians

See also
 Squareheads of the Round Table, a 1948 short film
 Squarehead catfish, a genus of fish
 List of screw drives#Square drives